Montana Highway 68 (MT 68) is a  state highway in the US state of Montana. The southern terminus is at Interstate 15 (I-15) in Cascade and the northern terminus is at I-15 north of Cascade.

Major intersections

See also

References

External links

068
Transportation in Cascade County, Montana